Nitot is a surname. Notable people with the surname include:

 Marie-Etienne Nitot (1750–1809), French jeweller and founder of the House of Chaumet
 Tristan Nitot (born 1966), president of Mozilla Europe